Frank LoVecchio is an American emergency medicine physician, medical toxicologist, academic and researcher. He is the medical director of Clinical Research at College of Health Solutions, the Director of Good Samaritan Regional Poison Center, the Research Director of Maricopa Medical Center Emergency Medicine Program, and clinical professor at Arizona College of Osteopathic Medicine. He also serves as an attending physician at Valleywise Health, Phoenix Children's Hospital, and in the Department of Medical Toxicology at Banner University Medical Center.

LoVecchio has authored various scholarly publications and book chapters. His research includes ketone levels in the lungs and blood, and pesticide exposures and scorpion stings in young children. He has served as primary or co-investigator on several National Institutes of Health grants.

He is one of the founding members of the Center for Toxicology and Pharmacology Education and Research of the University of Arizona College of Medicine. He is also associated with several professional organizations and societies, including American Board of Addiction Medicine, American College of Medical Toxicologists, American College of Emergency Physicians, Emergency Medicine Resident Association, Society of Academic Emergency Medicine, American Society of Forensic Examiners, and American Osteopathic Association. He has been a keynote speaker for numerous conferences, and has contributed on various media outlets.

Education 

LoVecchio studied at State University of New York at Stony Brook and received his bachelor's degree in General Science in 1988. He earned his Doctor of Osteopathic Medicine degree from New York College of Osteopathic Medicine in 1992 and a Master of Public Health from Harvard School of Public Health in 2002. He then completed his internship at St. Barnabas Hospital, affiliated with Cornell Medical College and New York College of Osteopathic Medicine in 1993, his residency at Mount Sinai School of Medicine Integrated Residency in Emergency Medicine,  Beth Israel Medical Center & City Hospital Center at Elmhurst in 1996, and his fellowship in Medical Toxicology at Good Samaritan Regional Medical Center in 1998. He is also board certified in Addiction Medicine and Medical Forensics.

Career 

LoVecchio joined New York City Emergency Medical Service Academy as a lecturer in 1995. In 2007, he held an appointment as clinical professor at Arizona College of Osteopathic Medicine.  He also held administrative appointments in his career. In 1998, he was appointed by Good Samaritan Regional Poison Center as an Associate Medical Director. He was associated with a program in Clinical Effectiveness at Harvard School of Public Health from 1999 till 2002, and with Federal Emergency Medical Assistance Program from 1998 till 2005. He served as Resident Research Director and then held appointment as a vice-chair of Department of Emergency Medicine at Maricopa Medical Center, University of Arizona College of Medicine 2009 to 2019. He was named medical director of Clinical Research at College of Health Solutions and is one of the founders of the Translational Research Center at Arizona State University.

Research 

LoVecchio's research mainly focuses on ketone levels in the lungs and blood, and pesticide exposures and scorpion stings in young children. He has advocated in the legal arena regarding medical toxicology, emergency medicine, addiction, product safety and public health issues, and has also worked as an on-air expert on topics including, public health, opioid crisis, and COVID-19. He was featured in National Geographic’ Drugs, Inc. Flesh-Eating Krokodil episode.

He has received funding to study suicide prevention, respiratory diseases, CPR, sepsis, and MRSA infections.

COVID-19 pandemic 

In a February 2021 New York Times documentary following Valleywise healthcare workers, LoVecchio gave positive remarks on the expected future COVID-19 situation in Arizona. In September of that year, he was part of a study that conducted a test-negative case-control investigation regarding the effectiveness of Moderna COVID-19 vaccine among U.S. health care personnel.

Emergency Medicine 

In 2014, LoVecchio conducted a multicenter trial in the tertiary care setting, and found out that protocol-based resuscitation of patients in whom septic shock was diagnosed in the emergency department did not improve outcomes. In his paper published in 2010, he investigated the survival rate of patients with out-of-hospital cardiac arrest using compression-only CPR (COCPR) compared with conventional CPR. Results of his study showed that layperson compression-only CPR was associated with increased survival in comparison to conventional CPR and no bystander CPR in this setting with public endorsement of chest compression–only CPR.

LoVecchio also investigated the influence of the infecting pathogen on the hospital length of stay (LOS) for acute bronchiolitis. He determined that RSV was more frequently detected virus in children hospitalized with bronchiolitis, as compared to HRV; which was detected in one-quarter of the children. Furthermore, he studied procalcitonin-guided use of antibiotics in context of lower respiratory tract infection.

In 1997, The dogma of avoiding analgesics in patients with acute abdominal pain  was challenged, and in one of the first studies addressing this issue, LoVecchio and his colleagues, concluded that physical examination does change after the administration of analgesics in patients with acute abdominal pain. He also conducted a study to determine the impact of ED-initiated intervention in terms of subsequent suicidal behavior.

Medical Toxicology 

LoVecchio published a paper in 2008 focused on how poison control centers decrease emergency healthcare utilization costs, and determined that the home management by Banner Poison Control Center provided large monetary savings to residents in comparison to dollars received in state support. He also focused his study on the centruroides sculpturatus and regarded it as the only scorpion native to the United States whose venom produces life‐threatening illness. He studied the distribution of the severity grades following scorpion envenomations, the time to deterioration, the onset of clinical signs and symptoms, and side effects regarding the antivenom treatment in children of particular age.

LoVecchio reviewed poison center data charts from January 2007 through December 2009, and discussed the outcomes of unintentional beta-blocker or calcium channel blocker overdoses among patients. Furthermore, he conducted a 5-year retrospective poison control center review and explored the outcomes regarding chlorine exposure in 598 patients.

Selected bibliography 

 A randomized trial of protocol-based care for early septic shock ProCESS Investigators New England Journal of Medicine 2014 370 (18), 1683-1693
 Mansbach, J. M., Piedra, P. A., Teach, S. J., Sullivan, A. F., Forgey, T., Clark, S., ... & MARC-30 Investigators. (2012). Prospective multicenter study of viral etiology and hospital length of stay in children with severe bronchiolitis. Archives of pediatrics & adolescent medicine, 2012 166(8), 700–706.
 Chest compression–only CPR by lay rescuers and survival from out-of-hospital cardiac arrest B.J. Bobrow, D.W. Spaite, R.A. Berg, U. Stolz, A.B. Sanders, K.B. Kern, et al. Jama 2012 304 (13), 1447-1454
 Procalcitonin-guided use of antibiotics for lower respiratory tract infection D.T. Huang, D.M. Yeally, MR et al. New England Journal of Medicine 2018 379 (3), 236-249
 Trimethoprim–sulfamethoxazole versus placebo for uncomplicated skin abscess D.A. Talan, W.R. Mower, A. Krishnadasan, F.M. Abrahamian, F. LoVecchio, N England Journal of Medicine 2016 374, 823-832
 Suicide prevention in an emergency department population: the ED-SAFE study I.W. Miller, C.A. Camargo, S.A. Arias, et al. 2017 JAMA psychiatry 74 (6), 563-570
 Effectiveness of mRNA COVID-19 Vaccine among U.S. Health Care Personnel New England Journal of Medicine 2021 Pilishvili T., et al.

See also 
 COVID-19 pandemic

References

External links
 

American medical researchers
21st-century American physicians
Living people
Stony Brook University alumni
Harvard School of Public Health alumni
20th-century American physicians
New York Institute of Technology alumni
National Institutes of Health people
American emergency physicians
American people of Italian descent
American medical academics
American osteopathic physicians
Year of birth missing (living people)